Tye Green is a village in the civil parish of Cressing and the Braintree district of Essex, England. In 2018, it had an estimated population of 1,114.

References 

Villages in Essex
Braintree District